Murut may refer to:

 Murut people, an ethnic group of the northern inland regions of Borneo
 Murutic languages or Murut languages, spoken by those people
 Tagol Murut language, the most widely spoken of the Murutic languages
 Murut, Azerbaijan, a village

Language and nationality disambiguation pages